The Jeffersonian Apartments is a large apartment building at 9000 East Jefferson Avenue, on the near-east side of Detroit, Michigan. Built in 1965, primarily of glass and steel in the international architecture style, it is one of Detroit's tallest residential buildings -- standing 30 stories with 412 residential units. 

The site is close to the MacArthur Bridge and Belle Isle. As the building is situated on a steep slope, the Jefferson Avenue entrance is 17 feet higher than the back entrance along the Detroit River.

Education
The building is zoned to Detroit Public Schools
 Howe Elementary School
 Butzel Elementary/Middle School (for 6-8)
 Southeastern High School

See also
List of tallest buildings in Detroit
Architecture of metropolitan Detroit
Robert Sharoff

References

External links
 
 
 Jeffersonian Detroit Apartments Website 

Apartment buildings in Detroit
Residential skyscrapers in Detroit
Residential buildings completed in 1965
Modernist architecture in Michigan
1965 establishments in Michigan